Frans Johan Theodor Nauman (7 December 1885 – 6 February 1947) was a Swedish water polo goalkeeper. He competed at the 1920 and 1924 Summer Olympics and finished in third and fourth place, respectively. His son Åke also became an Olympic water polo goalkeeper.

See also
 Sweden men's Olympic water polo team records and statistics
 List of Olympic medalists in water polo (men)
 List of men's Olympic water polo tournament goalkeepers

References

External links
 

1885 births
1947 deaths
Swedish male water polo players
Water polo goalkeepers
Water polo players at the 1920 Summer Olympics
Water polo players at the 1924 Summer Olympics
Olympic water polo players of Sweden
Olympic bronze medalists for Sweden
Olympic medalists in water polo
Medalists at the 1920 Summer Olympics
Stockholms KK water polo players
Sportspeople from Stockholm